Newman College is an Australian Roman Catholic co-educational residential college affiliated with the University of Melbourne. It houses about 220 undergraduate students and about 80 postgraduate students and tutors.  

The college is named after John Henry Newman, a former Anglican and major figure in the Oxford Movement who became a Catholic in the 19th century. Although affiliated with the University of Melbourne, a small number of students attend the Australian Catholic University, RMIT University and Monash University's Parkville and city campuses. Upon the foundation of the university in 1854, each of the four major Christian denominations were granted land at the north of the Parkville campus to accommodate students and teach theology. 

The college motto is Luceat Lux Vestra, translated from Latin as "Let Your Light Shine".

Student life

Facilities 
The majority of undergraduates live in the Carr and Mannix wings, which flank the domed dining room and are connected by a parapet. Undergraduates also live in the balcony rooms in Donovan wing, and in Fleming House at 950 Swanston St. Graduate students are accommodated in a variety of terrace houses opposite the college on Swanston St.

Students' Club 
All undergraduate members of Newman College are accepted into the Newman College Students' Club, a self-governing incorporated organisation which runs day-to-day and special events in the college. A general committee is elected annually. The portfolios include vice-president, secretary, community service, culture, equity and female and male sports representatives.

Postgraduates 
All members of the college administration, as well as tutors, academics in residence and postgraduate students (and some senior undergraduate students), comprise the SCR. Like the Students' Club, the SCR annually elect a president, secretary and treasurer, among other portfolios, to organise several events throughout the year.

Co-curricular activities 
The college places a strong emphasis on participation in co-curricular activities, with music, sport and the dramatic arts playing a large role in life at Newman. Soirées are held many times throughout the year, showcasing the talents of the students, with the Peter L'Estrange SJ Prize awarded to the best performing artist in college. The Michael Scott SJ Prize is the annual art competition. The Albert Power SJ Medallion for Debating is named after Newman's second rector, Albert Power SJ. The Choir of Newman College, established in 2002, is a chapel and concert choir.

Newman has a strong sporting culture, having won more than half of the intercollegiate football premierships ever played. The college is also a strong participant in intercollegiate art, music and culture events, winning the 2022 Intercollegiate Culture Cup.

Public seminars
The college hosts regular Irish studies seminars which are open to the public.

Daniel Mannix Memorial Lecture
The Archbishop Daniel Mannix Memorial Lecture was started by the Students' Club in 1977 and is a highlight of the university and college calendar. It is named in honour of the third Archbishop of Melbourne, who was a driving force behind the formation of the college and for improving the opportunities of Catholic students. Past lecturers have included Malcolm Fraser, Kim Beazley, Sir Joh Bjelke-Petersen, Patrick Dodson, Ita Buttrose, Sir Gustav Nossal, Alexander Downer, Manning Clark, Peter Garrett, Christine Nixon and Justice Alastair Nicholson.

Endowed chairs
Newman College hosts a number of endowed chairs at the University of Melbourne. They include the Gerry Higgins Chair of Irish Studies, the Gerry Higgins Lecturer in Philosophy, the Gerry Higgins Lecturer in Medieval Art History, the Gerry Higgins Lecturer in Shakespeare Studies and the Gerry Higgins Chair of Positive Psychology.

Buildings

The original set of campus buildings were built during 1916 to 1918 and were designed by American architects Walter Burley Griffin and Marion Mahony Griffin. The Burley Griffins also designed furniture for the college, including distinctive chairs, tables and bookshelves for the dining room and the original bedrooms of the college.  Much of this furniture remains in day to day use at the college, but some of it has found its way into various art galleries and private collections. This was recognised by its inclusion on the Australian National Heritage List on 21 September 2005, citing "one of the best examples of Griffin’s architecture in Australia" and "Newman College is significant as an outstanding expression of Griffin’s architectural style". The stonework has had substantial renovation to repair over 80 years of damage through exposure and natural degradation of the original stone and received the Australian Institute of Architects (Victorian Chapter) Heritage Architecture Award 2010.

Allan & Maria Myers Academic Centre
The Allan & Maria Myers Academic Centre is a library shared by St Mary's College and Newman College. It is open to students 24 hours a day. It offers a program of public events and hosts several special collections that are available to researchers.

The centre houses the Newman College Irish collection (O'Donnell Collection), which was formed in 1924 with a bequest to the college. It originally consisted of around 700 books and 300 pamphlets, many in the Irish language, which were the personal library of Nicholas O’Donnell, a Melbourne Irish language scholar of the early 20th century. Around half the collection consists of historical works. The rest deals with language, literature, biography, religion, politics, description and travel, with some works on music and a few on education.

Every year an O'Donnell Fellowship is bestowed on a visiting scholar so that the holder may do research in the O'Donnell Collection.

Administration
At its opening in 1918 the administration of the college was entrusted to the Society of Jesus (Jesuits) who continue its administration to the present day.

The college council, chaired by the Archbishop of Melbourne, oversees the governance of the college. Members include the Rector, the other three diocesan bishops of Victoria (of the Sandhurst, Ballarat and Sale dioceses), college alumni and members of the university. Members are appointed by the archbishop. Each year the rector selects two students to be members as student representatives. The presidents of the Students' Club and SCR are observers who reports to the council on the life of the college.

The college council has instituted the positions of Provost, Deputy Provost, Dean of Studies, and Dean of Students to oversee the everyday administration of the college. The Rector remains the official head of the college. These positions are currently held by:
Rector: Very Reverend Frank Brennan SJ AO
Provost: Dr Guglielmo Gottoli
Deputy Provost: Mrs Rebecca Daley
Dean of Studies: Mrs Charlotte O'Shea
Dean of Students: Ms Alicia Deak

The college chaplain, business manager, and services manager are also members of the college administration.

Rectors
As of 2023, the Rector of the college is Frank Brennan  , an Australian Jesuit priest, human rights lawyer and academic.

Notable alumni 
Notable alumni of the college include:

 Kevin Andrews – federal Liberal Party MP
 Frank Brennan – Jesuit priest, human rights lawyer and academic
 Peta Credlin – chief of staff to the former Prime Minister of Australia, Tony Abbott
 Neale Daniher – former AFL footballer (Essendon Football Club)
 Marg Downey – comedian and actress 
 Frank Galbally  – criminal defence lawyer 
 John Galbally  – former Labor politician 
 Sir James Gobbo – 25th Governor of Victoria and former Victorian Supreme Court judge, a former Rhodes Scholar
 James P. Gorman – CEO and chairman of Morgan Stanley
 Sir Gregory Gowans - left-leaning intellectual, lawyer and former Victorian Supreme Court judge
 Jack Hibberd – playwright
 Allan Myers – barrister, philanthropist and chancellor of the University of Melbourne
 Brenda Niall – biographer, literary critic and journalist
 Gemma Sisia – humanitarian, founder of the School of St Jude
 Charles Sweeney  – Federal Court of Australia judge
 Richard Tracey – Federal Court of Australia judge

See also
 List of Jesuit sites

References

External links 

 
Australian National Heritage listing for Newman College

Art Deco architecture in Melbourne
Federation style architecture
Buildings and structures in the City of Melbourne (LGA)
Residential colleges of the University of Melbourne
Australian National Heritage List
Catholic universities and colleges in Australia
Gothic Revival architecture in Melbourne
Walter Burley Griffin buildings
University and college buildings completed in 1918
1918 establishments in Australia